Following the August 1991 Soviet coup d'état attempt, the State Council of the Union of Soviet Socialist Republics (USSR), but also known as the State Soviet, was formed on 5 September 1991 and was designed to be one of the most important government offices in Mikhail Gorbachev's Soviet Union. The members of the council consisted of the President of the Soviet Union, and highest officials (which typically was presidents of their republics) from the Soviet Union's republics. During the period of transition it was the highest organ of state power, having the power to elect a prime minister, or a person who would take Gorbachev's place if absent; the office of Vice President of the Soviet Union had been abolished following the failed August Coup that very same year.

Inter-republican Economic Committee
With the central government's authority greatly weakened by the failed coup, Gorbachev established a four-man committee, led by Russian SFSR Premier Ivan Silayev, that included Grigory Yavlinsky, Arkadi Volsky, and Yuri Luzhkov, to elect a new Cabinet of Ministers. This committee was later transformed into the Committee on the Operational Management of the Soviet Economy (COMSE), also chaired by Silayev, to manage the Soviet economy. On 28 August 1991 the Supreme Soviet temporarily gave the COMSE the same authority as the Cabinet of Ministers, and Silayev became the Soviet Union's de facto Prime Minister. Yet, COMSE was quickly surpassed in authority by the Inter-republican Economic Committee of the Soviet Union (IEC), also led by Silayev. Its function was to coordinate economic policy across the Soviet Union. As Chairman of both COMSE and the IEC, Silayev presided over a quickly disintegrating Soviet Union.

When he first took office, Silayev wanted to reduce the powers of the central government and give more powers to the Soviet Republics. This view changed; he demanded that Yeltsin give back much of the authority of the central government which he had usurped following the August Coup. In this he failed, and his position as Russian SFSR Premier was severely weakened as a result. Oleg Lobov, Silayev's First Deputy Premier, led the anti-Silayev faction in the Russian SFSR Council of Ministers and managed to oust him on 26 September 1991; Lobov succeeded Silayev as acting Premier of the Russian SFSR. Silayev, as overseer of the economy, was given the task of initiating economic reforms in the Soviet Union in a way that suited both the central government and the Soviet republics. Silayev tried to maintain an integrated economy while initiating the marketisation of the economy. Further disintegration of the USSR led to the transformation of the IEC into the Interstate Economic Committee of the Economic Community (coordinating relations between the union republics and republics, declaring their secession from the USSR). The IEC showed its international intent by signing the European Energy Charter on 16/17 December 1991 with 35 other countries, but this was undermined by the charter also being signed by nine of the twelve remaining republics.

Dissolution of the Soviet Union
On 19 December COMSE was dissolved by a presidential Russian SFSR decree. Оn 25 December Gorbachev announced his resignation from the post of President of the USSR in connection with the creation of the Commonwealth of Independent States. Accordingly, the union government ceased to exist. The next day, 26 December 1991 the Soviet Union was formally dissolved by the Council of Republics.

References 

State Council
1991 disestablishments in the Soviet Union
1991 establishments in the Soviet Union
Perestroika